Jacob J. Wise (January 15, 1867 - April 7, 1930) was a Republican mayor of Massillon, Ohio from 1898 until 1902. He was also the Clerk of Massillon City Council for Massillion from 1903 until 1910. In 1912 he was elected to Ohio Senate for the 80th General Assembly.

Politics
During his time in the Senate, Wise was Chairman of the Senate Committee on Drainage and Irrigation, and a member of the following committees: Benevolent Institutions, County Affairs, Finance, Geological Survey, Labor, Manufactures and Commerce, Military Affairs, Public Works, State Buildings, and Temperance. He also served as Secretary of the Labor and Finance Committees. He was then re-elected to the legislature in 1914 for the 81 General Assembly.

Business and professional football
Wise began work at the age of 12, as a cashier in one of the leading dry goods stores in Massillon. This led his later career in the mercantile business as the director and vice president of A. J. Humberger & Son Dry Goods Company of Massillon. He later became a founder, and later manager, of the professional American football team, the Massillon Tigers of the Ohio League. In 1903, Wise, who was the Massillon Clerk of Courts, organized a group of 35 local business leaders who met in the Hotel Sailer in downtown Massillon, to form a professional football team. He then led a committee to secure the necessary funds for a new football and jerseys that were nearly the same color. Massillon's local venders only had a sufficient quantity of one jersey style to outfit an entire team. Those jerseys imitated the orange and black striped attire of the Princeton Tigers. So the new Massillon team was christened the "Tigers."

By 1905 Wise was the manager of the Tigers, who won the 1903, 1904 and 1905 Ohio League titles. He remained the manager until after Tigers won the 1906 Ohio League championship. Immediately afterwards, rumors of a betting fix tainted the championship. Major professional football would cease in Ohio until 1911.

Family
In 1887, Jacob married Elizabeth Axel, of Ashland, Ohio. The couple would go on to have a daughter, Margery Whitman, and a granddaughter, Mary Elizabeth. Jacob died in Massillon in 1930.

Notes

References

1867 births
Republican Party Ohio state senators
People from Massillon, Ohio
1930 deaths
Mayors of places in Ohio